Sergey Fyodorovich Lisovsky (born 25 April 1960, Moscow) is a Russian politician, who was a member of the Federation Council of the Russian Federation in 2004–2020, a representative of the Kurgan Regional Duma. TV host channel RBC TV. In the past - the entrepreneur. Candidate of Philology (2000). Member of the General Council of the party United Russia. It is one of the pioneers of the Russian social and political advertisements and an acknowledged expert on the contemporary electoral technologies.

Biography 
Sergey Fyodorovich Lisovsky was born April 25, 1960 in Moscow into a family of physicists. His father, Fyodor Viktorovich Lisovsky - known person in the scientific community, Doctor of Physical and Mathematical Sciences, Professor at the Institute of Radio Electronics of the Russian Academy of Sciences. Co-author of one of the most complete dictionary of electronics and other special technical dictionaries. Mother - Inna Fyodorovna Lisovskaya long time worked as a teacher of physics at school, now a housewife.

Career 
After school Sergei Lisovsky entered the Moscow Power Engineering Institute,  graduating in 1983 in the specialty  radiophysics, I was a student disk jockey. From 1983 to 1984 he worked as an engineer at the Central Institute of Radio Engineering, from 1984 to 1987 - was on the Komsomol  in the Bauman district committee of the Komsomol in Moscow (the instructor). In 1986, together with the Honored Artist of the RSFSR Yury Chernavsky takes part in the creation of non-public leisure center for youth - a company SPM  Record  (later - Moscow Studio). In 1989 he registered one of the first in the Soviet Union production companies  LIS’S (later Rice-LIS’S), which is engaged in the organization and conduct of various musical concerts.

On June 17, 1995 became a member of the Coordinating Council and a member of the Bureau of the COP of Business Roundtable Russia. In July, he was appointed general director of CJSC  ORTV-Advertising. In September, together with Boris Zosimov launched Russia's first music channel  K-10.

In 1996   one of the founders of the creative union of  Quinta, the president of the Russian Association of regional TV companies (RART), member of the National Advertising Council. Became a member of staff of the presidential election campaign of Boris Yeltsin and the organizer of a nationwide campaign  Vote or Lose. June 26, 1996, was detained together with  Arkady Evstafiev, when he tried to take away from the Government House a cardboard box from under the copier to $500 thousand. On October 19 the newspaper  New Look  was the first assistant of the President of the Russian Federation, head of the Russian President's Security Service Korzhakov published a sensational statement, which indicated that Berezovsky tried to persuade him to kill Lisovsky  (and Vladimir Gusinsky, Yuri Luzhkov and Kobzon). Western media responded to the statements Korzhakov.

In early 1997, he tried to leave Russia in the US, but in February, the US Embassy refused to issue him a visa. In September, he became co-chairman of the conciliation committee on the relationship of artists and Tax Service.

December 11, 1998 the employees of the tax police with the support of the FSB and RUOP staff conducted a series of searches in the office of JSC ORTV-Advertising in the country and in the flat Sergey and seized all the documents and money. In the same year he became president of the Association of Managers of music and show business.

In 1999 he became a member of the Board of Directors TV Centr television.

Since June 29, 2004 - the representative in the Federation Council of the Kurgan Regional Duma, First Deputy Chairman of the Federation Council Committee on Agrarian and Food Policy and Fishery, a member of the Federation Council Commission on Information Policy.

Since 2013, Lisovsky in the evening on RBC TV conducts the program  Capital, in which the guests studio interviews with the same volume of Karl Marx in his hand, from time to time quotes selected place. For Marx himself, according Sergey, he relates with undisguised sympathy, and his thoughts and writings is very instructive and relevant to today's business world.

Lisovsky is actively engaged in social activities in the field of culture - is one of the leaders of the Russian festival Kinotavr, as well as a member of the Public Council for advertising, the President of the Russian Association of Regional TV companies, Chairman of the All-Russian Confederation of creative.

He loves risky sports. He is fond of driving a helicopter, mountain climbing, hang gliding, golf, pilotage. In 1995 he participated in the Dakar Rally, finishing 47th in the SUV category.

Suspicion of involvement in the murder of Vladislav Listyev 
During the investigation of Vladislav Listyev murder that happened March 1, 1995 in Moscow, Lisowski was a suspect in a criminal case, his lawyer was Anatoly Kucherena. Lisovsky repeatedly mentioned in the media in connection with the loud murder in a criminal case it repeatedly interrogated, while Lisovsky never hiding from the investigation that set him apart from the alleged operatives of the murder of the organizer - the authority Solntsevo OPG Igor Dashdamirov a and alleged perpetrators, brothers Alexander and Andrey Ageikin. Following the resignation of the prosecutor general of the Russian Federation Yuri Skuratov in 1999, in which were carried out major investigations and established circle of suspects in the press again expanded version of involvement in the crime four main defendants, the first of which was called Lisovsky. According to Skuratov, the investigation was hampered by the Kremlin as the alleged sponsor of the customer was Yeltsin's presidential campaign in 1996.

References

External links
 Интервью Сергея Лисовского газете «Новый Взгляд» (1996)
 Сергей Лисовский о ВТО, сельском хозяйстве и российском чиновничестве
 Интервью  Лисовского: «Количество денег не влияет на свободу»

1960 births
Living people
Politicians from Moscow
Politics of Kurgan Oblast
Members of the Federation Council of Russia (after 2000)
Dakar Rally drivers
United Russia politicians
21st-century Russian politicians
Russian television presenters
Russian advertising executives
Eighth convocation members of the State Duma (Russian Federation)
Mass media people from Moscow